Autosticha merista is a moth in the family Autostichidae. It was described by Clarke in 1971. It is found on Rapa Iti.

References

Moths described in 1971
Autosticha
Moths of Oceania